Louis Marc Pons, marquis de Pons (fl. 1789), was a French diplomat. He was the ambassador of France in Stockholm from 1783 to 1789. He was the father of the politically active Camille du Bois de la Motte.

References
 Zbigniew Anusik, Dyplomacja szwedzka wobec kryzysu monarchii we Francji w latach 1787–1792, Wydawnictwo Uniwersytetu Łódzkiego Łódź 2000. (wielokrotnie wspomniany w książce).
 http://www.maison-de-rabaine.eu/spip.php?article213

18th-century French politicians
18th-century French diplomats
Ancien Régime office-holders
Ambassadors of France to Sweden